is a Japanese manga by Saki Okuse, and an OVA adaptation. The OVA was produced by Masao Maruyama, directed by Akiyuki Shinbo, and the screenplay was written by Duane Dell'Amico and Tatsuhiko Urahata. It was distributed and licensed in 1997 by Urban Vision.

Plot
Long ago, the Great Mother Spirit created demons, guardians, and humans. During 2089, only a few demons and guardians remain and in the city of Neo-Shinjuku. The guardian, Tsunami Shijo (an ancient fire manipulator from days long ago) is out to aid a fledgling human race. Tsunami is looking for a human who was transformed into a monster by drugs. This leads him to Mr. Takamiya, the Demon leader, who killed his lover.

Tsunami becomes involved with a woman who just lost her fiancé and her arm, and now wants to figure out why this has happened. Meanwhile, the Demon leader is still alive and plotting to enslave mankind.

Cast
Japanese Cast

Tsunami Shijo - Toshihiko Seki
Shizuka Tachibana - Emi Shinohara
Huang Long - Akira Kamiya
Chen Long - Urara Takano
Tenku - Hiroya Ishimaru
Kudo - Kaneto Shiozawa
Takamiya - Seizō Katō, Atsuko Takahata
Police Inspector Kumazawa - Takaya Hashi
Eiji Kuraza - Kunihiko Yasui
Kizaki - Masuo Amada
Tajima - Takehiro Murozono
Junk - Naoki Tatsuta
Squad Leader - Yasuhiko Kawazu
Receptionist - Miho Yamada
Voice of Car Navigator - Mizue Otsuka
Glider Officer - Koji Yusa
Girl #1 - Shihori Niwa
Girl #2 - Yuri Sato
Officer #1 - Yasumoto Kasahara
Narrator - Atsuko Takahata

English Cast

Tsunami Shijo - Andy Philpot
Shizuka Tachibana - Denise Poirier
Huang Long - John DeMita
Chen Long - Julia DeMita
Tenku - Matt K. Miller
Kudo - Steve Bulan
Takamiya - Barbara Goodson
Police Inspector Kumazawa - John Hostetter
Eiji Kuraza - Jack Fletcher
Tajima - Seth Margolies
Junk - Matt McKenzie

External links
Twilight of the Dark Master at the Internet Movie Database

1991 manga
1997 anime OVAs
Animated films based on manga
Madhouse (company)
Manga adapted into films
Shinshokan manga
Digital Manga Publishing titles
Supernatural anime and manga
Cyberpunk anime and manga